Central Street is a street in Magong City, Penghu County, Taiwan.

History
The area of the street was the first settlement in the island, making the street the oldest street in Penghu. During the Japanese rule of Taiwan, the street was expanded into a commercial area named The Seven Streets and One Market, which includes the surrounding adjacent alleys and market. After Taiwan was handed over from Japan to the Republic of China in October 1945, the street was redesigned and new commercial districts were built. In late 1980s, this historical street faced threats from urban development which might divide the street into smaller sections. Some local officials and scholars then launched a project in 1991 to preserve the street and made it a cultural and historical district.

Architecture
The oldest street in Makung, this winding, brick paved pedestrian street, located behind the city's Matsu Temple, features the Shihkung Ancestral Shrine and the Well of a Thousand Soldiers. In 1682 the goddess Matsu is said to have bequeathed a magical well to Ming soldiers massing for an invasion of Taiwan.

Buildings along this street also show a mixture of Western and Fujian elements, such as the Chien-i Tang Chinese Traditional Medicine Store. Many of them were constructed with red brick pillars and woods.

See also
List of roads in Taiwan

References

Footpaths in Taiwan
Penghu County